Kasandra Salamasina Le Tafa’ifa Vegas (born 1 March 1991) is a Samoan American athlete who has represented Samoa at the Pacific Games.

Vegas is from Honolulu, Hawaii, and was educated at Kamehameha High School and Northern Arizona University, where she majored in sports medicine and exercise science. In 2013 she was named a finalist for the National Collegiate Athletic Association women of the year award. She later studied for a master's degree in international public health at the University of Sydney in Australia.

She represented Samoa at the 2014 Oceania Athletics Championships in Rarotonga, winning bronze in both the discus and hammer throw. She won another bronze at the 2015 championships in Cairns. At the 2015 Pacific Games in Port Moresby, Papua New Guinea she won bronze in both the discus and hammer throw. She had hoped to be selected for the Samoan team for the 2016 Summer Olympics in Rio de Janeiro, Brazil, but failed to qualify.

References

Living people
1991 births
American sportspeople of Samoan descent
People from Honolulu
Kamehameha Schools alumni
Northern Arizona University alumni
University of Sydney alumni
Samoan female discus throwers
American female discus throwers
American female hammer throwers